Pouilly-sur-Loire (literally Pouilly on Loire) is a commune in the Nièvre department in central France.

Pouilly-sur-Loire is a town noted for the white wine known as Pouilly-Fumé.  There are several domaines that wine-tourists can visit and sample wines.  Two of those domaines are actual chateaux. Pouilly-sur-Loire station has rail connections to Nevers and Cosne-sur-Loire.

Demographics
On 1 January 2019, the estimated population was 1,606.

See also
Communes of the Nièvre department

References

Communes of Nièvre